The Budweiser 400 was an annual summer NASCAR Winston Cup race held from 1970 to 1988 at Riverside International Raceway in Riverside, California, United States. A 400-mile race was also run at the track in November 1963. The race distance was 400 miles until 1976 when it was shortened to 249 miles (400 kilometers). The other race at Riverside, the Winston Western 500, was held in January from 1965 to 1981 and November from 1981 to 1987.

Past winners

1974: The race was shortened by 10% in response to the fuel crisis.

Multiple winners (drivers)

Multiple winners (manufacturers)

References

External links
 

Former NASCAR races
 
Sports in Riverside, California